Dilip Joshi (born 26 May 1968) is an Indian film, television actor.

Personal life 
While doing BCA, he was awarded the INT (Indian National Theater) Best Actor.

Career 
Dilip Joshi started his acting career in 1989, playing the character of Ramu in the film Maine Pyar Kiya. Later, he appeared in several Gujarati dramas, one of them being Bapu Tame Kamaal Kari with Sumeet Raghavan and Amit Mistry, the trio known for their television show Shubh Mangal Savadhan. Joshi starred in the show Yeh Duniya Hai Rangeen and Kya Baat Hai  in which he played a South Indian. He also appeared in the films Phir Bhi Dil Hai Hindustani and Hum Aapke Hain Koun..!

During 2008, Joshi began a long run playing the role of Jethalal Champaklal Gada in the popular sitcom Taarak Mehta Ka Ooltah Chashmah. For his performance in the show, he received several accolades, including 5 Telly awards and 3 ITA awards.

Notable among his other tele-serials in Hindi are Kabhi Yeh Kabhi Woh, Hum Sab Baarati, Hum Sab Ek Hain, Shubh Mangal Savadhan, Kya Baat Hai, Daal Mein Kala and Meri Biwi Wonderful. He appeared in the children's comedy Agadam Bagdam Tigdam as Uncle Tappu, as well as in the 2009 films Dhoondte Reh Jaaoge and Ashutosh Gowarikar's What's Your Raashee.

Filmography

Films

Television

Awards

See also 

 List of Indian film actors
 List of Indian television actors

References

External links 

 

Living people
Indian VJs (media personalities)
Indian television presenters
People from Porbandar
21st-century Indian male actors
Male actors in Hindi cinema
Male actors from Gujarat
Gujarati people
1968 births